Tommaso Augello (born 30 August 1994) is an Italian professional footballer who plays as a defender for Serie A club Sampdoria.

Club career
Augello made his Serie C debut for Giana Erminio on 5 September 2014 in a game against Lumezzane.

On 9 July 2019, he joined Serie A club Sampdoria on loan with an obligation to buy.

Personal life
On 1 January 2022, he tested positive for COVID-19.

References

External links
 

Living people
1994 births
Footballers from Milan
Association football defenders
Italian footballers
A.C. Ponte San Pietro Isola S.S.D. players
Spezia Calcio players
U.C. Sampdoria players
Serie A players
Serie B players
Serie C players
Serie D players